Raw Nerve is a 1990 Australian film directed by Tony Wellington and starring Rebecca Rigg, Kelly Dingwall, and John Polson. The plot concerns three teenagers who rob a house.

Cast
Kelly Dingwall as David
Rebecca Rigg as Michelle
John Polson as Billy
Barry Leane as John Weatherby
Jan Kingrose as Miriam Weatherby
Kate Reid as Policewoman
Sylvia Coleman as Neighbor

Production
The film was mostly financed by the Australian Film Commission. It was shot over fifteen days, although the three leads rehearsed for three weeks.

Reception
The film received some strong reviews.

References

External links

Raw Nerve at TCMDB
Raw Nerve at Oz Movies
Review of film at SBS Movie Show
Interview with producer and director at SBS Movie Show

Australian drama films
1990 films
1990s English-language films